Call Me Irresponsible is the fifth studio album released by Canadian singer, Michael Bublé. It was released on May 1, 2007, by 143 Records and Reprise Records.

Release
The album's first single, "Everything", peaked at #46 on the U.S. Hot 100, Bublé's highest-peaking song until "Haven't Met You Yet" became his first Top 40 hit in 2009. It also debuted at number 3 on the Canadian BDS Airplay Charts and now holds the record for the highest debut ever on that chart. It also peaked at number 19 on the Australian ARIA Singles chart. Bublé appeared on an American Idol season 6 results show to sing "Call Me Irresponsible" when scheduled singer Tony Bennett, with whom he had collaborated before on the album Duets: An American Classic (2006) was unable to attend. On Monday, April 23, 2007, members of Bublé's official fanclub Bungalow B were given an exclusive listening party of the album's tracks and a look at a video clip at "Lost", Bublé's second original song. On this day, his official site was also given a makeover to match his coming album and his official YouTube channel released the video for the lead single. The channel also has behind-the-scenes videos and short snippets of videos used to make various commercials and preview clips. The entire album leaked shortly before its release. This album won the Grammy Award for Best Traditional Pop Vocal Album in 2007.

Chart performance
In the U.S., the album debuted at number two on the Billboard 200 and rose to number one in its second week. The album is certified 1× platinum in United States. In Australia, the single peaked at number 19 on the ARIA Singles Chart. While the album debuted on the ARIA Albums Chart at number 1 with Bublé selling 37,005 copies of the album in the first week and giving him the highest sales for an album by an international artist in Australia for 2007. The album was also certified Platinum in its first week for shipments of 70,000 copies. The album sold a further 30,634 copies the second week, making Bublé the first artist in Australia for 2007 to sell over 30,000 units two weeks in a row. The album is now certified 4× platinum by ARIA for shipments of 280,000 copies. The album rose to number one again on July 2 and 9 and once more on July 22. The original version of Call Me Irresponsible has sold over 300,000 copies in the UK. In Europe, the album was certified 2× Platinum by IFPI for shipments of two million copies to date.

Track listing

Personnel 
Musicians
 Michael Bublé – vocals 
 Jochem van der Saag – programming, sound design
 Gerald Clayton – keyboards (1), acoustic piano (5)
 Tamir Hendelman – acoustic piano (1, 7), synthesizers (13)
 David Foster – acoustic piano (2, 3, 6, 8, 10, 11), Rhodes piano (3, 8), keyboards (4)
 Alan Chang – additional acoustic piano (8), acoustic piano (9)
 Greg Phillinganes – acoustic piano (12)
 Mike Melvoin – acoustic piano (13)
 Graham Dechter – guitars (1)
 Dean Parks – guitars (2-6, 9-12)
 Heitor Pereira – guitars (8)
 Michael Landau – guitar (9)
 Keith Scott – guitar (9)
 David Sinclair – acoustic guitar (9)
 Larry Koonse – guitars (13)
 Christoph Luty – bass (1)
 Nathan East – bass (2, 6)
 Brian Bromberg – bass (3, 4, 5, 7, 8, 10, 11, 12)
 Norm Fisher – bass (9)
 Chuck Berghofer – bass (13)
 Jeff Hamilton – drums (1)
 Vinnie Colaiuta – drums (2-8, 10, 12)
 Josh Freese – drums (9)
 Joe LaBarbera – drums (11)
 Ralph Humphrey – drums (13)
 Emil Richards – percussion (1)
 Rafael Padilla – percussion (2, 3, 5, 6, 7, 9, 10, 12)
 Paulinho da Costa – percussion (4, 8)
 Marcelo Costa – percussion (8)
 Don Williams – percussion (13)
 Joel Peskin – saxophone solo (10)
 Emily Blunt – backing vocals (3)
 Boyz II Men – vocals (5)
 Ivan Lins – vocals (8)
 
The Clayton-Hamilton Jazz Orchestra Horn Section (Track 1)
 Steve Becknell, Daniel P. Kelley, Joe Meyer and John A. Reynolds – French horn
 Lee Callet, Frederick Fiddmont, Tom Peterson and Rickey Woodard – saxophones 
 George Bohanon, Guy Nepal, Ryan Porter and Maurice Spears – trombone 
 Gilbert Castellanos, Sal Cracchiolo, James Ford, Kye Palmer and Bijon Watson – trumpet 
 Jim Self – tuba

Horns and Additional backing vocals (Track 10)
 David Boruff, Gary Foster Bill Liston, Sal Lozano and Joel Peskin – saxophones
 Alan Kaplan, Charles Loper, Bruce Otto and Phil Teele – trombone 
 Rick Baptist, Wayne Bergeron, Dan Fornero and Bryan Lipps – trumpet 

Choir (Track 12)
 Lynne Fiddmont, Anthony Field, Sharlotte Gibson, Clorishey Lewis, Valerie Pinkston, Louis Price, Donald Smith, Beverley Staunton, Lisa Vaughn, Windy Wagner and Mervyn Warren 
Additional vocals 
 Carmen Carter, Siedah Garrett and Toni Scruggs 

Arrangements
 John Clayton Jr. – arrangements (1)
 David Foster – arrangements (2-6, 8, 10, 11), horn arrangements (2-5, 10), string arrangements (2, 3, 4, 11), vocal arrangements (5), rhythm arrangements (12)
 Jerry Hey – horn arrangements (2, 3, 5), string arrangements (2)
 William Ross – string arrangements (3, 11)
 Don Sebesky – horn arrangements (4, 10), string arrangements (4)
 Boyz II Men – vocal arrangements (5)
 Paul Buckmaster – string arrangements (6)
 Alan Chang – arrangements (6, 9)
 Bill Holman – arrangements (7)
 Jorge Calandrelli – string arrangements (8)
 Michael Bublé – arrangements (9), horn arrangements (10)
 Bob Rock – arrangements (9)
 Mervyn Warren – choir, horn, rhythm and string arrangements (12)
 Johnny Mandel – arrangements (13)
Music Contractors
 Ray Brown, Carmen Carter, Jules Chakin and Gina Zimmitti 
Music Preparation 
 Julie Eidsvoog, Suzie Katayama and Joann Kane

Production 
 David Foster – producer (1-8, 10-13)
 Humberto Gatica – producer (1-8, 10-13), recording (1-8, 10-13), mixing
 Bob Rock – producer (9)
 Johnny Mandel – co-producer (13)
 Moogie Canazio – engineer (8)
 Eric Helmkamp – recording (9)
 Alejandro Rodriguez – additional engineer, digital audio engineer 
 Jorge Vivo – additional engineer, digital audio engineer 
 Jochem van der Saag – additional engineer
 Chris Brooke – digital audio engineer
 Sam Holland – assistant engineer 
 Mike Houge – assistant engineer 
 Sam Koop – assistant engineer 
 Dean Maher – assistant engineer 
 Eric Mosher – assistant engineer 
 Jared Nugent – assistant engineer 
 Eric Rennaker – assistant engineer 
 Antonio Resendiz – assistant engineer 
 Andrew Shaw – assistant engineer
 Paul Smith – assistant engineer 
 Seth Waldmann – assistant engineer 
 Aaron Walk – assistant engineer 
 Ghian Wright – assistant engineer 
 Vlado Meller – mastering 
 Janna Terrasi – A&R administration 
 Kathy Frangetis – A&R assistant 
 Courtney Blooding – production coordinator 
 Maggie Cashman – production assistant 
 Matt Taylor – art direction, design, additional photography 
 Ellen Wakayama – art direction 
 William Claxton – photography 
 Eric Ogden – photography
 Hugo Boss – wardrobe 
 Bruce Allen – management

Studios
 Additional recording at Capitol Studios and Conway Studios (Hollywood, California); Signet Sound Studios, Westlake Audio, The Village Recorder and Record Plant (Los Angeles, California); The Warehouse Studio (Vancouver, British Columbia, Canada).
 Masteted at Sony Music Studios (New York City, New York).

Charts

Weekly charts

Year-end charts

Decade-end charts

Certifications and sales

References

143 Records albums
2007 albums
Albums produced by David Foster
Albums recorded at Capitol Studios
Albums recorded at The Warehouse Studio
Albums recorded at Westlake Recording Studios
Grammy Award for Best Traditional Pop Vocal Album
Michael Bublé albums
Reprise Records albums